Putuo District is a district of Zhoushan City, Zhejiang, China with a population of 378,805.

The district used to be a county. In 1987, it was combined with the neighbouring county of Dinghai to form the city of Zhoushan.

Basic Information 

 District Seat: Shenjiamen Sub-District 
 Population: 378,805 as of November 1, 2010
 Area:  ( terrestrial,  marine)
 Population Density: 
 Gross Domestic Product: 24.6 billion yuan  as of 2011
 Per capita GDP: 64,941 yuan (approximately 10,443 US Dollars)

Geography 

Putuo District occupies the southeastern part of Zhoushan archipelago. It includes the eastern end of the archipelago Zhoushan Island, which is the largest island of the archipelago, and many dozens of smaller islands. Among them:
 the small, but famous Putuo Island (Putuo Shan, i.e. "Mount Putuo"). Putuo Island with nearby small islets is administratively organized as Putuo Town within Putuo District.
 Zhujiajian Island, connected to Zhoushan Island by a bridge, and administratively organized as Zhujiajian Town.
 Dengbu Island, organized as an eponymous township
 Mayi Island (literally, "Ant Island"), organized as an eponymous township
 Zhongjieshan Island Chain, organized as Dongji.
 many others, with half a dozen towns and townships on them

Administrative divisions
Subdistricts:
Shenjiamen Subdistrict (沈家门街道), Goushan Subdistrict (勾山街道), Donggang Subdistrict (东港街道), Zhanmao Subdistrict (展茅街道), Zhujiajian Subdistrict (朱家尖街道)

Towns:
Liuheng (六横镇), Taohua (桃花镇), Xiazhi (虾峙镇), Dongji (东极镇), Putuoshan (普陀山镇)

Townships:
Baisha Township (白沙乡), Dengbu Township (登步乡), Mayidao Township (蚂蚁岛乡)

Climate

Sister cities
 Port St. Lucie, Florida, United States of America

References 

Districts of Zhoushan
Island counties of China